Inés Alberdi (born 11 February 1948) was the Executive Director of UNIFEM and has been a noted academic, policy advisor and policy maker on family and women’s issues. Eisenhower Fellowships selected Inés Alberdi in 1998 to represent Spain.

Career 
Her previous posts have included the following work: Deputy for the Spanish Socialist Workers' Party in the Madrid Assembly (2003 to 2007); at the Equal Opportunities Unit of the European Commission on the networks Family and Work and Diversification of Occupational Choices for Women (1998–2000); Advisor to the Inter-American Bank as Adviser for Women in Development (1989–1990); Associate Researcher at George Washington University, Washington, DC (1988–1989); Member of the Board of INSTRAW, the United Nations International Research and Training Institute for the Advancement of Women (1986–1989); Professor of Sociology at Madrid University and Director for Research at the Centre for Sociological Research (1992–1993); Visiting Scholar in the Department of Sociology at Georgetown University, Washington, DC (1978–1979)

Family 
Her husband, Miguel Ángel Fernández Ordóñez, is the former governor of the Bank of Spain and her sister is a former Social Affairs Minister Cristina Alberdi. She has two children.

Publications 
 Alberdi, Inés (2007) Los hombres jóvenes y la paternidad (Fundación BBVA, Madrid),
 Alberdi, Inés (2005) Violencia: Tolerancia cero (with Luis Rojas Marcos, Obra Social de la Fundación la Caixa, Barcelona)
 Alberdi, Inés (2000) Las mujeres jóvenes en España (Ediciones La Caixa, Barcelona).

References 

Spanish women sociologists
1948 births
Living people
Members of the 6th Assembly of Madrid
Members of the 7th Assembly of Madrid
Members of the Socialist Parliamentary Group (Assembly of Madrid)